Senator Chafin may refer to:

Ben Chafin (born 1960), Virginia State Senate
Truman Chafin (born 1945), West Virginia State Senate